William Joseph Hicks (born April 7, 1933) is an American former professional baseball player. He appeared in 212 games played in Major League Baseball over all or parts of five seasons as an outfielder and pinch hitter for the Chicago White Sox (1959–60), Washington Senators (1961–62) and New York Mets (1963). He graduated from high school in Charlottesville, where he attended the University of Virginia.

Hicks signed with the White Sox in 1953, beginning his pro career. After five seasons in the minor leagues and two years of service in the United States Army, Hicks was recalled by the pennant-bound White Sox in September 1959. He hit only .191 and was left exposed in the expansion draft. However, he remained on the Washington roster during the full  campaign, playing in 102 games, starting 29 in the outfield. He hit six home runs in limited service, but he batted only .224 overall and his contract was sold to the Mets at the close of the campaign.

In his final MLB year, Hicks started 46 games for the 1963 Mets, and hit .226 with five home runs. He concluded his career with a three-year stint with Triple-A Buffalo. Hicks was a solid offensive player in the minor leagues, batting .313 in 11 seasons. But limited playing time in the majors hurt his production: he collected only 92 total hits, with 11 doubles, three triples and 12 homers, in his 212 games, batting .221.

Personal
Hicks met his wife while playing for the Boer Indians in Nicaragua. 

Hicks' grandson is professional soccer player Lee Johnston.

References

External links

1933 births
Living people
Baseball players from Virginia
Buffalo Bisons (minor league) players
Chicago White Sox players
Colorado Springs Sky Sox (WL) players
Indianapolis Indians players
Madisonville Miners players
Major League Baseball outfielders
Memphis Chickasaws players
New York Mets players
People from Ivy, Virginia
San Diego Padres (minor league) players
Virginia Cavaliers baseball players
Washington Senators (1961–1971) players
American expatriate baseball players in Colombia
American expatriate baseball players in Nicaragua